Markéta Vondroušová was the defending champion, but chose not to participate.

Viktória Kužmová won the title after defeating Verónica Cepede Royg 6–4, 1–6, 6–1 in the final.

Seeds

Draw

Finals

Top half

Bottom half

References
Main Draw

Empire Slovak Open - Singles